Tamás Székely (born 24 May 1959) is a Hungarian born evolutionary biologist, conservationist, and author.

He is a Professor of Biodiversity at the University of Bath, Honorary Professor at the University of Debrecen (Hungary) and visiting Professor at Beijing Normal University (China) and Sun Yat-Sen University (China). Székely was a visiting professor at Harvard University, University of Groningen, Bielefeld and Göttingen.

His research includes phylogenetic analyses, experimental and observational analyses of behaviour in wild populations, and theoretical modelling. His research interests lie predominantly with mating systems and parental behaviour, breeding systems in shorebirds and conservation of wetland birds.

Research 

Tamás Székely is an evolutionary biologist interested in the evolution of social behaviour and aspects related to social behaviour: ecology, genetic diversity, neurobiology, theoretical biology and phylogenetics. His work combines different tools, methods and approaches, ranging from genes and genomes to population studies.

Székely started off his early career studying forest birds, then shifted his focus onto shorebirds (Charadriiformes, sandpipers, plovers and allies) as he was interested in the variation that they display in their breeding systems. He now uses shorebirds as model organisms to answer key questions about the evolution of social behaviours.

His current research focusses on two themes 1) the evolution of mating systems, parental care and sex roles where he is trying to understand how male and female reproductive strategies evolved in vertebrates, and 2) the implications of adult sex ratio (ASR) on social and breeding variation

Education and career 

In 1983 Tamas Székely graduated from Kossuth University (now the University of Debrecen), Hungary, as a teacher of biology and chemistry. In 1983 he undertook his PhD on foraging ecology of forest birds at Kossuth University. After completing his PhD in 1986, he became a research assistant with the Hungarian Ornithological Society in Budapest. After a Soros-scholarship funded post-doctoral research at the Edward Grey Institute of Field Ornithology, Oxford, he took up a lecturer position in animal behaviour at Kossuth University in 1988 and established a behavioural ecology research group in Eastern Europe (the VÖCS), which he led until 1994. Székely continued his university career at the University of Bristol in 1995 and then moved to the University of Bath in 2000, where he became a lecturer and in 2007, a Professor of Biodiversity. In 2010 he founded the Maio Biodiversity Foundation in Cape Verde, a conservation NGO focusing on the protection and conservation of birds, sharks, sea turtles and whales.  In 2016, Székely was a Fellow of Institute of Advanced Studies (WIKO)   in Berlin and led a research group there. In 2018, he started the ÉLVONAL  project funded by the Hungarian Government, a four-year long project focusing on sex role evolution in shorebirds. Székely compiled an international network of scientists working on 30 different shorebird species in 26 locations worldwide towards one common goal.

Awards and recognition 
Tamas Szekely holds several awards including the Humboldt Prize Award and the Royal Society Wolfson Research Merit Award. Székely became a foreign member of the Hungarian Academy of Sciences in 2019. He received the Honorary Plaquette of Kazincbarcika City (Hungary) in 2019, and in 2020 he was awarded the Order of Merit of the Kingdom of Hungary (Magyar Érdemrend).

Selected publications 
Kubelka, V., M. Šálek, P. Tomkovich, Zs. Végvári, R. Freckleton & T. Székely. 2018. Global pattern of nest predation is disrupted by climate change in shorebirds. Science 362: 680-683.
Remeš, V., R. P. Freckleton, J. Tökölyi, A. Liker & T. Székely. 2015. The evolution of parental cooperation in birds. Proceedings of the National Academy of Sciences, US 112: 13603-13608.
Pipoly, I., V. Bókony, M. Kirkpatrick, P. F. Donald, T. Székely & A. Liker. 2015. The genetic sex-determination system predicts adult sex ratios in tetrapods. Nature 527: 91 – 94. *Equal contribution.
Székely, T., F. J. Weissing & J. Komdeur. 2014. Adult sex ratio variation: implications for breeding system evolution. Journal of Evolutionary Biology 27: 1500-1512.
Liker, A., R. P. Freckleton & T. Székely. 2013. The evolution of sex roles in birds is related to adult sex ratio. Nature Communications 4: 1587.
Székely, T., A. J. Moore & J. Komdeur (eds). 2010. Social behaviour: genes, ecology and evolution. Cambridge University Press, 1-562.
Fairbairn, D., W. Blanckenhorn & T. Székely (eds). 2007. Sex, size and gender roles. Evolutionary studies of sexual size dimorphism. Oxford University Press, 1-266.
Houston, A. I., T. Székely & J. M. McNamara. 2005. Conflict over parental care. Trends in Ecol Evol 20: 33-38.
Székely, T., R. P. Freckleton & J. D. Reynolds. 2004. Sexual selection explains Rensch’s rule of size dimorphism in shorebirds. Proceedings of The National Academy of Sciences US 101: 12224 - 12227.
Blomqvist D., M. Andersson, C. Küpper, I. C. Cuthill, J. Kis, R. B. Lanctot, B. K. Sandercock, T. Székely, J. Wallander & B. Kempenaers. 2002. Genetic similarity between mates explains extra-pair parentage in three species of waders. Nature 419: 613-615.

References

Living people
1959 births
Alumni of the University of Bath
Evolutionary biologists
Hungarian biologists
University of Debrecen alumni